Bališ is a surname, it may refer to:

 Boris Bališ, Slovak football winger
 Denis Bališ, Slovak football defender
 Igor Bališ, Slovak former football defender
 Milan Bališ, Slovak ice hockey player
 Slavomír Bališ, Slovak football midfielder

Surnames